Guatteria panamensis is a species of plant in the Annonaceae family. It is endemic to Panama.  It is threatened by habitat loss.

References

Endemic flora of Panama
panamensis
Vulnerable plants
Taxonomy articles created by Polbot